Maksim Aleksandrovich Shevchenko (born 11 February 1983) is a Russian professional football coach and a former player. He is an assistant coach with FC Kuban-Holding Pavlovskaya.

Club career
He made his Russian Football National League debut for FC Amur Blagoveshchensk on 8 August 2005 in a game against FC Fakel Voronezh. He played 9 seasons in the FNL for Amur, FC Baltika Kaliningrad, FC Salyut Belgorod and FC Kuban Krasnodar.

External links
 

1983 births
People from Yeysk
Sportspeople from Krasnodar Krai
Living people
Russian footballers
Association football midfielders
FC Spartak-UGP Anapa players
FC Baltika Kaliningrad players
FC Salyut Belgorod players
FC Kuban Krasnodar players
FC Volgar Astrakhan players
FC Armavir players
FC Amur Blagoveshchensk players
Russian football managers